Police Outpost Provincial Park is a provincial park in southern Alberta, Canada, located  south of Cardston.

The park was established on April 21, 1970. South of the border lies the Blackfeet Indian Reservation in Glacier County, Montana.

Activities
The following activities are available in the park:
Birdwatching (loons, swans, sandhill cranes)
Camping
Canoeing and kayaking
Cross-country skiing ( ungroomed trails)
Fishing is open from April 1 to October 31 (effective 2008) which generally precludes ice fishing. Rainbow trout are the main sportfish. 
Front country hiking
Power boating

See also
List of provincial parks in Alberta
List of Canadian provincial parks
List of National Parks of Canada

References

External links

Provincial parks of Alberta
Cardston County